Night School: The Web Series is a British web series based on the Night School novels by CJ Daugherty. It was the first ever web series based on a British young adult book. The show premiered on YouTube on 12 December 2014. The series was written and created by CJ Daugherty and Jack Jewers.

Series overview
The series follows Allie Sheridan a 16-year-old girl from Brixton who is sent away to boarding school after a string of arrests. But the school isn't all it seems. Cimmeria Academy is an exclusive private school for the children of the elite. At the heart of Cimmeria is Night School, a Bullingdon Club style secret society whose members are both destined to run the country and mentored by the world’s most powerful people. But Allie soon learns that their glamorous and exciting world is laced with deception and danger. Everyone lies and everyone hides secrets. Secrets that can kill.

Though set within the world of the Night School novels, the web series presents new stories featuring the characters, rather than a straight adaptation of the books.

Cast and characters

Main cast
 Jessica Sargent as Allie Sheridan
 Campbell Challis as Carter West
 Danny Carmel as Nathaniel St. John
 Grace Parry as Katie Gilmore
 Jodie Hirst as Jo Arringford
 Damien Thomas as Jeremy Simpson
 Lewis Lilley as Mark Lacey
 Jessica Swallow as Eleanor Crawley
 Kunjue Li as Lucy Li
 Louis Clarke-Clare as Sylvain Cassell
 Tom Blount as Gabe Porthas

Production

The project was announced in October 2014. Filming took place between August and November 2014 in the south of England, with principal locations including Frensham Heights School near Farnham, Surrey.

Episodes

Reception

Night School was covered widely in the UK media on its release, with some international coverage too. The response was positive. The Guardian ran a front page story on the series and hosted the first episode. The US-based Daily Dot headlined their coverage "Start watching 'Night School' if you want to keep up with the tweens in your life" and described the series as "a heads-up as to what your younger sister or daughter will be talking about in a few weeks." Teen publications such as Maximum Pop!, Sugarscape, and Top of the Pops covered the series extensively, with positive reviews. 

The US-based Indie Series Network (originators of the Indie Soap Awards) named Night School the best web series in the world in its weekly poll of independently-produced web series three times, for Power, All the Pretty Killers, and Bang, and nominated a fourth time for The Gilmore Girl. The same polls named Danny Carmel best actor; and Jodie Hirst and Jessica Sargent best actress.

The series had extensive coverage in the regional UK media, including the Eastern Daily Press, the Southern Daily Echo, Get Surrey, the Bournemouth Daily Echo, and the Belfast Telegraph. BBC Radio and London Live broadcast news features and interviews about the series.

Night School was an official selection at the Marseille Web Fest, NYC Web Fest, Washington D.C. Web Fest, and Dublin Web Fest. In February 2016, Night School was nominated for five awards at the Indie Series Awards in Los Angeles.

References

External links
 
 

2014 web series debuts
2015 web series endings
British teen drama web series
YouTube original programming